Dichochaete is a genus of fungi in the family Hymenochaetaceae. The genus was circumscribed in 2000 by Estonia mycologist Erast Parmasto.

References

Hymenochaetaceae
Agaricomycetes genera